D525 is a state road in the Slavonia region of Croatia that connects the A3 motorway's Slavonski Brod zapad (west) interchange to the D53 and D49 state roads, facilitating access from the A3 motorway to Slavonski Brod form the west and to Pleternica. The road is 25.6 km long.

The road, as well as all other state roads in Croatia, is managed and maintained by Hrvatske Ceste, state owned company.

Traffic volume 

Traffic is regularly counted and reported by Hrvatske Ceste, operator of the road.

Road junctions and populated areas

Sources

See also
 A3 motorway

State roads in Croatia
Brod-Posavina County
Požega-Slavonia County